Flight 258 may refer to the following incidents involving commercial airliners:
Northeast Airlines Flight 258, a Conviar CV-240 that crashed upon landing at Nantucket Memorial Airport on 15 August 1958, resulting in 25 out of the 34 people on board being killed.
Aigle Azur Flight 258, an Airbus A321-200 that suffered a tailstrike and was substantially damaged at 8 January 2008, following a hard landing at Houari Boumediene Airport.

0258